Pelham Schools may refer to:
Pelham School District in New Hampshire
Pelham Public Schools in New York
Pelham City Schools in Alabama